George Fairhurst Hutchinson (1844 – 23 November 1923) was an Australian politician.

He was born at Canterbury to Edward and Mary Hutchinson; his father was a station manager. He worked as a saddler at Forbes, and was a long-serving alderman who served many times as mayor. His first marriage was to Mary Detores around 1866; they had four children. His second marriage, which took place around 1877, was to Emily Gilligan and produced eleven children. In 1891 Hutchinson was elected to the New South Wales Legislative Assembly for Forbes, representing the fledgling Labor Party. He refused to sign the pledge and in 1894 was defeated as an independent free trade candidate. Hutchinson died at North Sydney in 1923.

References

External link
 Members - Parliament of Australia

 

1844 births
1923 deaths
Members of the New South Wales Legislative Assembly
Australian Labor Party members of the Parliament of New South Wales